Stanisław Wieśniak (14 March 1930 – 21 February 2012) was a Polish rower. He competed in the men's coxless pair event at the 1952 Summer Olympics.

References

1930 births
2012 deaths
Polish male rowers
Olympic rowers of Poland
Rowers at the 1952 Summer Olympics
Sportspeople from Vilnius
People from Wilno Voivodeship (1926–1939)